The Lafayette Leopards women’s basketball team is the college basketball program representing Lafayette College in Easton, Pennsylvania. The Leopards currently participate as part of the NCAA Division I basketball, and compete in the Patriot League. The Leopards currently play their home games at the Kirby Sports Center.

History
Since the Leopards began play in 1972, they have an all-time record of 509–710 (through 2018–19), though they have not had a winning season since 1997–98. They have never appeared in the NCAA Tournament, but they went to the Eastern Association of Intercollegiate Athletics for Women (EAIAW) playoffs in 1977, 1978, and 1981. They won the East Coast Conference title in 1985, 1987, and 1988.

References

External links